Kulraj Kaur Randhawa (born 16 May 1983) is an Indian actress who appears in Hindi and Punjabi language films. She best known her role as "Kareena" in the TV series Kareena Kareena.

Filmography

References

External links 
 
 
 Interview with Kulraj Randhawa

1983 births
Indian television actresses
Indian film actresses
Living people
Actresses in Hindi cinema
Female models from Uttarakhand
Actresses from Dehradun
Actresses in Punjabi cinema